RVT may refer to:

Regionalized variable theory, a geostatistical method used for interpolation in space.
Remote and virtual tower
Renal vein thrombosis
Reusable Vehicle Testing, a Japanese Space Agency project from 1998 until 2003
Royal Vauxhall Tavern
Registered Veterinary Technician in the United States
Ravensthorpe Airport, IATA airport code "RVT"